Kind of Brown is a studio album by American jazz bassist Christian McBride together with his band Inside Straight, released on . This was McBride's first album of new material in six years, and the first to be released on the Mack Avenue label.

Background
Kind of Brown is the debut album for Christian McBride and his band Inside Straight. It was followed up with the second release, People Music in 2013. Kind of Brown was nominated for 41st NAACP Image Awards as an Outstanding Jazz Album. The album consists of 10 tracks mostly written by McBride.

Reception
Will Lyman of PopMatters wrote "With his new band, “Inside Straight”, and its new disc Kind of Brown, McBride finally feels focused and serious.  This music is unself-consciously traditional: it’s fun; it swings its ass off.  It’s not experimental, but it gives superb voice to several brilliant players and one new discovery. This is the kind of recording that the great players of the past would have put out every year or so. And now Christian McBride, the finest bassist of his generation, is on track. It’s his best record, and it puts a little jump in your step. It’s hot."

Phil Johnson of The Independent noted "Heard live, the music of star bassist Christian McBride’s quintet might swing, but this album (a tribute to the late double bassist Ray Brown, not that you’d guess) is strictly jazz for middle managers: the themes are corny or cute; the feel is too polite to be properly funky and the frontline of soprano sax and vibes sounds ingratiating rather than challenging. The main problem here is that no one appears to have anything to say, or any particular reason to say it. Impeccably played, of course".

Damian Erskine of Bass Musician mentioned "Great solo performances are lavished on every tune behind a very hip and tight ensemble. Christian himself sounds better than ever, both in section mode, and offering up some very moving bass solos, again, everything we would expect from this very accomplished musician".

Track listing

Personnel

Band
Christian McBride – acoustic bass
Steve Wilson – alto, soprano saxophone
Warren Wolf, Jr. – vibes
Eric Reed – piano
Carl Allen – drums

Production
Raj Naik – design
Jesse Nichols  – assistant engineer
Justin Gerrish – engineer 
Joe Ferla – recording, mixing
Gretchen Carhartt Valade – executive producer
Keith Henry Brown – illustration 
Orrin Keepnews – liner notes
Mark Wilder – mastering

Chart performance

References

External links
 Christian McBride Discography

2009 albums
Christian McBride albums
Mack Avenue Records albums